Hiber Conteris (Paysandú, 23 September 1933 – 2 June 2020) was a Uruguayan writer, playwright, and literary critic.

He wrote extensively in the pages of Marcha and, as a Methodist, he was very influential in the Protestant world.

Works 
 1959: Enterrar a los muertos
 1960: Este otro lado del telón
 1963: Cono Sur
 1963: El socavón
 1963: El desvío
 1965: Villa Anastacio
 1966: Virginia en Flashback
 1968: El nadador, Roman
 1969: El asesinato de Malcolm X
 1986: El Intruso
 1986: El diez por ciento de tu vida
 1987: La Diana en el Crepúsculo
 1987: Información sobre la Ruta 1
 1988: La cifra anónima
 1996: ¿Qué desea cenar?
 1996: El breve verano de Nefertiti
 1998: El cielo puede esperar
 1998: Round Trip – Viaje regresivo
 1999: Mi largo adiós a Raymond Chandler
 2001: Rastros de ceniza
 2002: Oscura memoria del sur
 2005: Onetti en el espejo
 2008: El Intruso

References 

1933 births
2020 deaths
People from Paysandú
University of Buenos Aires alumni
Uruguayan writers
Uruguayan novelists
Uruguayan essayists
Uruguayan short story writers
Uruguayan literary critics
Uruguayan dramatists and playwrights
Uruguayan expatriates in the United States
Uruguayan Methodists